Josias Mathiem Ebersohn (born 23 February 1989) is a former South African rugby union professional player that usually played as a fly-half.

He also represented the South Africa U20 side in 2008 and 2009.

He retired after the 2017 season to become a farmer in the Hartswater area.

Personal

They were born and raised in Bloemfontein, South Africa and schooled at Grey College. Here they climbed the ranks and eventually represented the Free State schools team at the national Under-18 Craven Week. They were chosen to represent the South Africa Under-20 team at the 2008 and 2009 IRB Junior World Championships.

Both players were quickly grabbed into the  rugby squad.

They considered themselves a package deal, as they've been playing side-by-side from school level.

Squads

Sias Ebersohn was involved in the following squads:

2013–2015
Western Force (Super Rugby)
2011–2012
Toyota Free State Cheetahs (Currie Cup)
Cheetahs (Super Rugby)
2010
Cheetahs (Super 14)
Vodacom Free State Cheetahs (Currie Cup)
Vodacom Free State Cheetahs (Vodacom Cup)
Vodacom Free State Cheetahs (ABSA Under 21 Competition)
2009
Vodacom Free State Cheetahs (Currie Cup)
South Africa (IRB Junior World Championship) – Captain
Vodacom Free State Cheetahs (ABSA Under 21 Competition)
Vodacom Free State Cheetahs (Vodacom Cup)
2008
South Africa (IRB Junior World Championship)
Vodacom Free State Cheetahs (ABSA Under 21 Competition)
Vodacom Free State Cheetahs (Currie Cup)
Vodacom Free State Cheetahs (Vodacom Cup)
Shimlas (FNB Varsity Cup)
2007
SA Schools (SA Schools)
Free State (U18 Coca-Cola Craven Week)
2006
Free State (U18 Coca-Cola Craven Week)
2005
Free State (U16 Coca-Cola Grant Khomo Week)

Super Rugby Statistics

References

External links
Western Force Player Profile
Cheetahs Profile

Scrum.com Profile
itsrugby.co.uk Profile

1989 births
South African rugby union players
Cheetahs (rugby union) players
Western Force players
Free State Cheetahs players
Rugby union fly-halves
Afrikaner people
Alumni of Grey College, Bloemfontein
South African expatriate rugby union players
Expatriate rugby union players in Australia
South African expatriate sportspeople in Australia
Rugby union players from Bloemfontein
Living people
South Africa Under-20 international rugby union players